was a Japanese actor. He appeared in more than one hundred films from 1963 to 2008.

Selected filmography

References

External links 

1943 births
2008 deaths
Japanese male film actors
Japanese male television actors
Male actors from Tokyo
20th-century Japanese male actors
21st-century Japanese male actors